Knitty.com is an online knitting magazine, founded and edited by Amy Singer and published quarterly since fall 2004.

Knitty publishes knitting patterns and advice on learning to knit. "Judy's Magic Cast On", a toe-up technique for knitting socks, was first published in Knitty.

References

External links
 

2004 establishments in Ontario
Canadian websites
Knitting publications
Magazines established in 2004
Magazines published in Toronto
Online magazines published in Canada
Visual arts magazines published in Canada
Arts and crafts magazines